Tonshi Mountain is a mountain located in the Catskill Mountains of New York southeast of Phoenicia. Acorn Hill is located northeast, Ohayo Mountain is located east-northeast, and Little Tonshi Mountain is located west-southwest of Tonshi Mountain.

References

Mountains of Ulster County, New York
Mountains of New York (state)